Horst Fantazzini (4 March 1939, Altenkessel, Saarland, German Reich – 24 December 2001, Bologna, Italy) was an Italian-German individualist anarchist who pursued an illegalist lifestyle and practice. He gained media notoriety mainly due to his many bank robberies throughout Italy and other countries. In 1999 the film Ormai è fatta! appeared based on his life

Biography 
Horst was born in Altenkessel in the Saar region of Germany on 4 March 1939. His father was Alfonso "Libero" Fantazzini, a Bolognese anarchist partisan and bricklayer, and his mother Bertha Heinz, a factory worker. The name Horst means "refuge" and this was chosen by his father who was himself a political refugee.

Due to the extremely difficult conditions which affected his family, he left school and started work at an early age as a porter, or working in factories or offices. He started to carry out a series of small thefts, of bicycles and motorbikes, and then cars. When he was 18 in 1960 he worked as barman and married a very young girl, Anna, who - two years later - was pregnant with their first child. In order to provide a decent standard of living for his young family, he carried out his first robbery with a toy pistol at the Corticella post office. He was arrested in a stolen car and was sentenced to 5 years in prison. In 1967 Horst had been on the run for months while he carried out several robberies in northern Italy. "During one of these, he became known as the "kind bandit" - one of the cashiers fainted during the robbery, and the next day he sent her a bunch of roses. After that, he decided to leave the country and went to stay with relatives in Germany." "Between 1967 and 1968 he wrote a series of mocking letters to the Italian police and he was labelled the "Red Pimpernel". And what was this dangerous criminal wanted by half the police in Europe doing? As soon as he reached Paris he went to the Louvre to see the Mona Lisa. He lived in a luxury villa in Mannheim with his young partner... a refined dandy, the height of elegance, driving sports cars, hopping between France, Germany and Italy acquiring millions which he carried around with him on his first-class air flights."

In 1968 he was arrested while trying to rob a bank in Saint-Tropez. In 1972, thanks to a lawyer, Leone, he was extradited to Italy. In the 1970s he tried to escape from prison twice. In 1975, the Verona publisher, Giorgio Bertani, published Fantazzini's book, Ormai è fatta, a detailed recounting of his escape from Fossano prison on 23 July 1973, which Horst took 48 hours to write on a small typewriter. The book was recently re-published by El-Paso/Nautilus. "In 1978, following a serious beating at the hands of the police which left him nearly in a coma, he managed to smuggle out (against the advice of the Brigate Rosse) a document on the Asinara Revolt which was later published by Anarchismo under the title "Speciale Asinara" successively "L'ipotesi armata".

"In 1989, Horst had still not lost heart nor the will to live. He studied while in prison in Busto Arsizio and was close to getting his degree in literature from the University of Bologna when his old fondness for escape got the better of the books and led him to escape while out on leave. He would stay on the run for a year during which he carried out three more robberies, until he was re-captured in 1991 not far from Rome (despite not offering any resistance at his arrest - he was walking his dog at the time - the Messaggero newspaper described him as a dangerous terrorist) and transferred to Alessandria prison where he would remain for 10 years."

In 1999 he was moved to Bologna. A film called Ormai è fatta!, directed by Enzo Monteleone appeared inspired by Horst's book. Horst himself enthusiastically approved the screenplay for the film.

"In Alessandria, he worked and dreamt at his computer that he was able to buy with the prize money from a literary competition in 1993, which he had won with a short story entitled "L'uomo cancellato" (The man who was wiped out)...On 19 December 2001, with his accomplice and long-time friend C. T., he tried to rob his last bank - a bank which had in reality been one of his first, the Agricola e Mantovana Bank. He was arrested before going in and he desperately tried to flee on his bicycle...He died in the hospital wing of Dozza prison on 24 December at 7.30pm. The cause of death was given as an "abdominal aortic aneurism"...A non-religious funeral for Horst was held in Bologna on 29 December 2001 while at the same time there was a demonstration held outside Dozza prison."

References 

People from Saarbrücken (district)
Italian anarchists
Illegalists
Individualist anarchists
German anarchists
1939 births
2001 deaths
People extradited from France
People extradited to Italy
German people imprisoned abroad
German people of Italian descent